Knights Of, also known as Knights Of Media, is a London-based independent publishing house, specialising in publishing inclusive children's books.

History
Knights Of was founded in 2017 by Aimée Felone and David Stevens, who previously worked for Scholastic. In 2018 the company set up a pop-up bookshop, #ReadTheOnePercent, on Coldharbour Lane in Brixton, and in 2019 they established a permanent bookshop, Round Table Books, in Brixton. In 2020 Knights Of and Jacaranda Books launched a crowdfunding appeal to try to assure their survival in the face of the COVID-19 pandemic.  Winner of Children’s Publisher of the Year 2022 at the British Book Awards.

Authors published
Knights Of authors include the BAME writers Jason Reynolds and Sharna Jackson and deaf author Samantha Baines. In 2020 Knights Of published A Kind of Spark, the debut novel of Elle McNicoll, Scottish Children’s writer that follows the efforts of an eleven-year-old autistic narrator, Addie.

References

External links
 Knights Of website

British companies established in 2017
Publishing companies established in 2017
Book publishing companies based in London
Children's book publishers